Eurammon (stylised as eurammon) is a European non-profit initiative for natural refrigerants.  It was set up in 1996 and comprises European companies, institutions, and industry experts.  It is based in Frankfurt (Main), Germany.  The initiative's name is composed of the words "Europe" and "ammonia".  The objective of Eurammon is to jointly promote the greater use of natural refrigerants, as they have almost no effect on global warming and on the depletion of the ozone layer.

Background and objectives 

Natural refrigerants have been used for refrigeration since the mid-19th century, mainly in food production and storage. Ammonia (NH3), in particular, has been the refrigerant in use in industrial refrigeration for more than 130 years. In the 1950s and 60s, however, it began to be replaced more and more in new plants by synthetic refrigerants.

The Eurammon initiative arose out of the lack of acceptance for natural refrigerants.  The initiative's objective is to promote the use of natural refrigerants.  For its members, Eurammon acts as a knowledge pool or platform facilitating the worldwide sharing of information and international networking.

Activities of the eurammon initiative

Eurammon Symposium 
This annual event, organised by Eurammon and held in English, informs operators, planners, system engineers, and other interested parties about the applications of natural refrigerants.  The latest legislation and the analysis of life-cycle costs of refrigeration systems are just some of the topics discussed.

Natural Refrigeration Award 
Every two years, Eurammon awards the Natural Refrigeration Award at the Eurammon Symposium.  It recognises young scientists for their outstanding theses in the field of natural refrigerants.  The purpose of the award is to support the next generation of scientists and encourage them to engage in further research on natural refrigerants in the field of refrigeration technology.  Degree and doctoral graduates can submit their official examination papers.  Three prizes are awarded, totalling 5,000 euros.  The winners also have the opportunity to present their thesis to the congregated experts at the international Eurammon symposium.  In 2013, Eurammon announced the award together with the Faculty of Thermal Process Engineering of the Technical University of Hamburg-Harburg and the Norwegian trade magazine KULDE og Varmepumper.

Technical Committee 
In May 2011, the European initiative for natural refrigerants Eurammon set up a new committee to consider technical issues and new developments in the field of natural refrigerants.  The team, comprising around 25 experts, considers technical issues concerning all aspects of natural refrigerants that come to Eurammon's attention.  Thematically, the issues concern all areas of refrigeration technology in which natural refrigerants are or could be used.  The committee is open to all Eurammon members interested in technical debate and who wish to develop their know-how in this field.  In addition to the Technical Committee, there is also a special working group, which deals specifically with all issues and topics relating to the refrigerant ammonia.

Working group on Ammonia
Members of Eurammon discuss current issues in the field of the natural refrigerant ammonia.  The work group is headed by Eric Delforge (Mayekawa Europe) and aims to raise the general awareness of ammonia and its applications.

International network
Eurammon facilitates the worldwide sharing of information and international networking through an international network, which the initiative has been building up since its foundation in 1996.  Mutual memberships and cooperations are currently in place with:

 Association of Ammonia Refrigeration (AAR), India – Pune
 Association Française du Froid (AFF), France – Paris
 Australian Refrigeration Association, Australia – Bowral NSW
 EUROVENT the European Committee of Air Handling & Refrigeration Equipment Manufacturers, Belgium  Brussels
 FRIO CALOR AIRE ACONDICIONADO,S.L., Spain – Madrid
 Green Cooling Association, Australia – Castle Hill
 HVAC&R Management Technology Development Center, Iran  Tehran
 International Academy of Refrigeration, Representative Office in Kazakhstan, Kazakhstan  Almaty
 International Institute of Ammonia Refrigeration (IIAR), USA – Arlington, VA
 Islamic Azad University, Iran  Tehran
 Nederlandse Vereniging van Ondernemingen op het gebied van de Koudetechniek en Luchtbehandeling (NVKL), the Netherlands – Zoetermeer
 Odessa State Academy of Refrigeration (OSAR), Ukraine – Odessa
 Romanian General Association of Refrigeration, Romania  Bucharest
 Slovenian Association for Cooling and Air Conditioning (SDHK), Slovenia – Ljubljana
 Southern African Refrigerated Distribution Association (SARDA), South Africa – Cape Town
 Swiss Association for Refrigeration Technology (SVK), Switzerland – Maur

International Congress of Refrigeration
In 2011, Eurammon was an official partner of the 23rd International Congress of Refrigeration (ICR), which took place from 21 to 26 August 2011 in the Czech capital, Prague.  The theme of the event was “Refrigeration for Sustainable Development”, and it was organised by the International Institute of Refrigeration (IIR).  Visitors were invited to find out about the sustainable side of refrigeration and air-conditioning technology using natural refrigerants.

Executive Board
A new executive board is elected every two years. It is currently composed of the following five members:
 Bernd Kaltenbrunner (KWN Engineering GmbH)
 Monika Witt (Th. Witt Kältemaschinenfabrik GmbH)
 Georges Hoeterickx (Evapco Europe N.V.)
 Thomas Spänich (GEA Refrigeration Germany GmbH)
 Mark Bulmer (Georg Fischer Piping Systems)

References

External links 
 http://www.eurammon.com
 http://www.eurammon.com/natural-refrigerants/fact-sheets-refrigerants
 Green Cooling Initiative on alternative natural refrigerants cooling technologies

International sustainability organizations
Organizations established in 1996
Refrigerants
International organisations based in Germany